Espergærde station is a railway station serving the suburb of Espergærde in North Zealand, Denmark, circa 40 km north of central Copenhagen.

The station is located on the Coast Line between Helsingør and Copenhagen. The train services are currently operated by the railway company DSB Øresund, which runs a frequent Oresundtrain service between Helsingør and Malmö. Espergærde is a quiet residential neighbourhood and the station sees mostly local traffic.

History
Espergærde station was not one of the original stations on the Coast Line which opened in August 1897. DSB estimated that the customer base was too small for a station. However, shortly the opening of the railway line, a local initiative managed to strike a deal with the Ministry of Interior Affairs and DSB which provided the necessary funding for a station, resulting in the opening of the station in May 1898.

Buildings
The red timber structure on the east side of the tracks is the original station building. The brick building next to it was constructed in 1904–05.

A new station building with ticket office and a kiosk on the west side of the tracks was inaugurated in November 1997.

See also
 List of railway stations in Denmark

References

Railway stations in the Capital Region of Denmark
Buildings and structures in Helsingør Municipality
Railway stations opened in 1898
1898 establishments in Denmark
Art Nouveau railway stations
National Romantic architecture in Denmark
Railway stations in the Øresund Region
Railway stations in Denmark opened in the 19th century